Syed Abdullah Ali Shah (Urdu: سید عبد الله على شاہ, December 1934 – 14 April 2007) was a Pakistani politician and lawyer who served as chief minister of the Sindh province of Pakistan from 1993-1996. Shah, a practicing lawyer, hailed from a humble background but went on to achieve a lot of respect and love from the people of Sindh and Pakistan.

Life 
Syed Abdullah Ali Shah was born on 11 December 1934 in Wahur village in Dadu District of Sindh province. He was educated in Karachi and graduated as a lawyer. He was married and had five daughters and two sons. His son Syed Murad Ali Shah is the current chief minister of Sindh. Abdullah Shah joined the Pakistan Peoples Party (PPP) in 1970 and was provincial minister during the tenure of former Chief Minister Mumtaz Bhutto. Syed Abdullah Ali Shah held the position of Speaker of Sindh Assembly from December 1988 to August 1990 and the Chief Minister of Sindh from 21 October 1993 to 6 November 1996. Abdullah Shah was a close confidant of Prime Minister Bhutto. Ms. Bhutto has said, "Shah Sahib was the son of the soil of Sindh and Pakistan. A brave man, he lived and died for his country and for the love and prosperity of the most impoverished."

See also 
 List of Chief Ministers of Sindh
 Provincial Assembly of Sindh
 Government of Sindh
 Syed Murad Ali Shah

References 

Chief Minister of Sindh

}

1934 births
2007 deaths
People from Jamshoro District
Sindhi people
Chief Ministers of Sindh
Pakistan People's Party MPAs (Sindh)
Sindh MPAs 1993–1996
Speakers of the Provincial Assembly of Sindh
Deputy Speakers of the Provincial Assembly of Sindh